Milesia  is a genus of very large hoverflies, which mimic social wasps. For example, the European species Milesia crabroniformis is a convincing mimic of the hornet species Vespa crabro. Milesia are predominantly Palaeotropical in
distribution almost entirely Oriental.

The Larvae are of the short-tailed type, found in decaying heartwood of deciduous trees, including rot-holes.

Species List
M. afra Doesburg, 1955
M. anthrax Hippa, 1990
M. aperta Hippa, 1990
M. apicalis Snellen van Vollenhoven, 1863
M. apsycta Séguy, 1948
M. arnoldi Malloch, 1932
M. balteata Kertész, 1901
M. bella Townsend, 1897
M. bequaerti (Doesburg, 1955)
M. bigoti Osten Sacken, 1882
M. brunetti Herve-Bazin, 1923
M. brunneonigra Hippa, 1990
M. caesarea Hippa, 1990
M. cinnamomea Hippa, 1990
M. citrogramma Hippa, 1990
M. collina Hippa, 1990
M. confluens Hippa, 1990
M. conspicienda Walker, 1859
M. conspicua Curran, 1928
M. crabroniformis Fabricius, 1775
M. cretosa Hippa, 1990
M. crinita Hippa, 1990
M. dearmata Hippa, 1990
M. diardi Snellen van Vollenhoven, 1863
M. elegans Matsumura, 1916
M. excelda Curran, 1928
M. ferruginosa Brunetti, 1913
M. fissipennis Speiser, 1911
M. flavifacies Bigot, 1876
M. fuscicosta Bigot, 1875
M. gigantea Hippa, 1990
M. illustris Hippa, 1990
M. imperator Hippa, 1990
M. insignis Hippa, 1990
M. insistens Curran, 1931
M. labellata Hippa, 1990
M. lieftincki Hippa, 1990
M. limbipennis Macquart, 1848
M. maai Hippa, 1990
M. macularis Wiedemann, 1824
M. maolana Chang & Yang, 1993
M. metallica Curran, 1931
M. micans Hippa, 1990
M. mima Hippa, 1990
M. nigra Fluke, 1939
M. nigriventris He & Chu, 1994
M. ochracea Hippa, 1990
M. oshimaensis Shiraki, 1930
M. overlaeti (Doesburg, 1955)
M. paucipunctata Yang & Cheng, 1993
M. pendleburyi Curran, 1928
M. pennipes Hippa, 1990
M. plumipes Hippa, 1990
M. prolixa Hippa, 1990
M. pulchra Williston, 1892
M. quantula Hippa, 1990
M. reinwardtii Wiedemann, 1824
M. rex Hippa, 1990
M. ritsemae Osten Sacken, 1882
M. scutellata Hull, 1924
M. semifulva Meijere, 1904
M. semiluctifera (Villers, 1789)
M. semperi Osten Sacken, 1882
M. sexmaculata Brunetti, 1915
M. simulator Hippa, 1990
M. sinensis Curran, 1925
M. spectabilis Hippa, 1990
M. tadzhikorum Peck & Hippa, 1988
M. tigris Hippa, 1990
M. titanea Hippa, 1990
M. trilobata Hippa, 1990
M. undulata Snellen van Vollenhoven, 1862
M. variegata Brunetti, 1908
M. verticalis Brunetti, 1923
M. vespoides Walker, 1857
M. virginiensis (Drury, 1924)
M. yaeyamana Matsumura, 1916
M. zamiel Walker, 1856

gallery

References

Diptera of Europe
Eristalinae
Diptera of North America
Diptera of Africa
Diptera of Asia
Hoverfly genera
Taxa named by Pierre André Latreille